The Computer Security and Industrial Cryptography research group, commonly called COSIC, is a research group at the Department of Electrical Engineering of KU Leuven, which is headed by Bart Preneel.

Research 
Research and expertise in digital security:
 Security architectures for information and communication systems
 Cryptographic algorithms and protocols
 Symmetric key
 Public key
 Post-quantum
 Security for embedded systems
 Privacy-preserving systems
Applications:
 Cloud 
 Automotive
 Privacy
 Data Protection
 Trusted Systems
 E-payments 
 E-documents
 ...

AES 
One of the well-known successes is the selection of Rijndael as the Advanced Encryption Standard (AES). Currently AES is used by millions of users in more than thousand products, such as the protection of US government information.

Research projects 
COSIC has participated in over 50 European research projects.

IMEC 
COSIC is part of the Smart Applications and Innovation Services of imec.

References

External links
 
 Imec
 The Wall Street Journal: In Belgium, an Encryption Powerhouse Rises

Cryptography organizations